opened in Tokushima, Japan, in 1992. The museum is located in a garden with the ruins of Tokushima Castle, and features exhibits about the history of the castle.

See also

 Tokushima Prefectural Museum

References

External links
  Tokushima Castle Museum

Museums in Tokushima Prefecture
Tokushima (city)
Museums established in 1992
1992 establishments in Japan